The FLN football team (in , in ), also known as Le onze de l'indépendance was a team made up mainly of professional players in France, who then joined the Algerian independence movement of the National Liberation Front (FLN), and assisted in organizing football matches against national football teams. The FLN linked African football to anti-colonial resistance using the idea of Pan-Africanism as a legitimizing tool and symbol of national identity.

History
The team was founded on 13 April 1958 during the war of independence against France. The role of this team was primarily psychological, in order to show the French metropolitans that even professional footballers were involved in the cause, even to the extent of renouncing their status. Evidently so, in 1958 ten of Algeria’s professional football (soccer) players based in France fled the country, traveling through Switzerland and Italy, to Tunis home of the Provisional Government of the republic of Algeria (GPRA). There was one setback at the Franco-Swiss border with the arrest of Mohamed Maouche of Stade Reims. The departure of the ten players made news all around the world through mainstream media, though their successes were not acknowledged particularly in the United States.

The French authorities easily obtained the non-recognition of the team by FIFA. Despite the prohibition on play, the FLN team engaged in a world tour of about eighty meetings, including Europe, Middle East, Asia and Africa. Of these meetings, the FLN won 55 matches. As Algeria remained one of France’s oldest colonies in Africa since the 1830s, these football (soccer) games were widely used by pro-independence propaganda. The objective of the FLN football team was to deny France the service of key players, heightening international awareness of the Algerian fight for independence and to demonstrate that the FLN had the support of both Algerians at home and those abroad.

The team existed from 1958 to June 6, 1962 when the "national" team was officially disbanded1962, bequeathing its place in 1963 to its legitimate successor, the Algeria national football team. The overall idea of a national team in exile had its origins in the politicization of football (soccer), with the intention to create an arena for the anti-colonial resistance and road to liberation during the war of independence against France. Shortly after, Algeria gained its independence on July 5, 1962.

ALN Team
A year before the formation of the FLN team, two former Algerian players and coaches decided to train in Tunis, the first selection that would represent Algeria, they are Ahmed Benelfoul and Habib Draoua. In 1956, the team was formed. And in May 1957, the team was approved by the National Liberation Front and decided that it would represent the National Liberation Army as there were players who came from the maquis. The team is mainly composed of amateur players playing in Algeria and Tunisia. Between May 1957 and April 1958, they played many matches in the Maghreb and the Middle East to support the independence cause; the team is credited with 42 victories. This selection will contribute to the birth of the formation of the FLN Team a year after its creation.

FLN Team's Unique Playing Style
The FLN was a unique soccer team because of their playing style, which was fluid and based on finesse. This approach to the game of football was very different from the norm. The most common form of playing football is based on a very complicated and scientific approach, while the FLN rather focused on fluidity. The FLN football team as stated by Rachid Mekhloufi who was a French football team manager, noted that the FLN used a 4-2-4 system of offense. This system gave players a great amount of flexibility in movement while playing a football game, which proved to be very effective. This offensive style of play used by the FLN team was also seen as entertainment and honorable by spectators. The usual football playing mechanics focus on defensive playing in order to lower the risk of the opposing team scoring a goal. This playing style was the normal way to play football in the 1970s, but not for the FLN team. The FLN team's unique playing style could be noted to lead to the FLN team's popularity and importance in the African struggle for freedom and equality.

Player selection

References

External links
 Equipe FLN : History and Matches on RSSSF

Former national association football teams
Algeria national football team
African national and official selection-teams not affiliated to FIFA
1958 establishments in France
1962 disestablishments in France
Algerian War